Morris Cargill CD (10 June 1914 – 8 April 2000, Kingston) was a Jamaican lawyer, businessman, planter, journalist and novelist.

He was also a columnist for the Jamaican Gleaner.

Life 
Educated at Munro College, a prestigious Jamaican secondary school, and the Stowe School in England, Cargill was articled as a solicitor in 1937.  During World War II, he worked for the Crown Film Unit in Britain. After the war, he played a role in the development of the coffee liqueur Tia Maria.  Returning to the Caribbean he worked as a newspaper editor in Trinidad, and, having acquired a banana plantation in Jamaica, began a career as a columnist for the Gleaner newspapers in 1953 which was to last, with some interruptions, until his death. Until the late 1970s, his articles appeared under the pseudonym Thomas Wright.

In 1958, he was elected to the parliament of the Federation of the West Indies, as a candidate of the Jamaica Labour Party, and served as deputy leader of the opposition in that legislature for the next four years.

In 1964 he persuaded his friend Ian Fleming to write the introductory article for a guidebook to Jamaica called Ian Fleming introduces Jamaica. In the late 1960s and early 1970s, he collaborated with novelist John Hearne, under the pseudonym 'John Morris', on a series of three thrillers – Fever Grass, The Candywine Development, and The Checkerboard Caper—about an imaginary Jamaican secret service. Cargill makes an appearance, in the surprising guise of a high court judge, at the end of Fleming's novel The Man with the Golden Gun.

For two years in the late 1970s, he left Jamaica because of his opposition to the government of Michael Manley, returning in 1980 to join the campaign against Manley. During this period he lived in the United States and worked for the publisher Lyle Stuart, editing a study of the Third Reich in Germany called A Gallery of Nazis, and writing a memoir called Jamaica Farewell (an expanded version of which was reissued in 1995).

Assassination attempt 
On May 26, 1969, Keith Clarke shot Morris Cargill in the buttocks, although he survived the attack. Around the same time, Clarke successfully shot and killed industrial chemist Julius Walenta.

References

20th-century Jamaican lawyers
Jamaican male writers
1914 births
2000 deaths
Jamaican people of European descent
Jamaican planters
Jamaican columnists
Jamaican journalists
People educated at Munro College
Jamaica Labour Party politicians
Members of the Federal Parliament of the West Indies Federation
Jamaican expatriates in the United Kingdom
Jamaican expatriates in Trinidad and Tobago